Wilfredo "Freddie" Dominguez Quizon (July 27, 1956 – November 18, 2005) was the son of Comedy King Dolphy and Engracita Dominguez.

Life and career

Quizon was born in Manila. He is the fourth son of Rodolfo V. Quizon and Gracita Dominguez. He is married to Nelda Sisic and has three sons: Rowell, Nico and John John Quizon.

Death
He died from injuries he sustained after he fell inside his home. He was buried at the Quizon mausoleum in Quezon City.

Filmography

Actor

Miscellaneous Crew

References

External links

1956 births
2005 deaths
Male actors from Manila
Filipino male child actors
Filipino male film actors
Freddie
20th-century Filipino male actors
21st-century Filipino male actors